The 2020–21 SV Sandhausen season is the club's 105th season in existence and the club's 9th consecutive season in the second flight of German football. In addition to the domestic league, SV Sandhausen participated in this season's edition of the DFB-Pokal. The season covers the period from 1 July 2020 to 30 June 2021.

Players

First-team squad

Pre-season and friendlies

Competitions

Overview

2. Bundesliga

League table

Results summary

Results by round

Matches

DFB-Pokal

Notes

References

External links

SV Sandhausen seasons
SV Sandhausen